Bottlenose may refer to:

Cetacea 
 Bottlenose dolphin, the genus Tursiops
 Bottlenose whale, the genus Hyperoodon
 Lagenorhynchus, a genus of dolphins

Fish 
 Mormyrus caschive, the Eastern bottlenose
 Bottlenose skate, Rostroraja alba
 Rhynchobatus australiae, bottlenose wedgefish

Other 
 Bottlenose (company), a trend intelligence company

See also
The Battersea Bottlenose, a juvenile northern bottlenose whale found in the River Thames in 2006

Animal common name disambiguation pages